OGF can refer to:
 Open Gaming Foundation for role-playing games
 Open Grid Forum for grid computing
 Ordinary generating function in mathematics
 Opioid growth factor, an alternative name for met-enkephalin